Tosun is a surname and given name. Notable people with the name include:

Given name
Tosun Bayrak (1926–2018), Turkish author, translator, and Sufi
Tosun Terzioğlu (born 1942), Turkish mathematician and academic administrator

Surname
Buse Tosun (born 1995), Turkish female sport wrestler
Cemil Tosun (born 1987), Austrian footballer
Cenk Tosun (born 1991), Turkish football player
Erdal Tosun (1963–2016), Turkish actor
Gürdal Tosun (1967–2000), Turkish actor
Hamide Bıkçın Tosun (born 1978), female Turkish Taekwondo athlete
Hilal Tuba Tosun Ayer (born 1970), Turkish female referee
Ismail Tosun (born 1975), Australian celebrity chef
Murat Tosun (born 1984), Turkish football player
Necdet Tosun (1926–1975), Turkish actor

See also
 Tosun (construction equipment), remote controlled armored wheel loader developed in Turkey for combat engineering missions
Tosun Paşa, 1976 Turkish comedy film, directed by Kartal Tibet

Turkish-language surnames
Turkish masculine given names